Altfraunhofen is a municipality in the district of Landshut in Bavaria in Germany.

History
Before 1800, Altfrauhofen was ruled by the "Baron of Fraunhofen."  However, the imperial immediacy of Fraunhofen was not recognized by the Bavarian elector-princes.  When Napoleon established the Confederation of the Rhine in 1806, the city became part of Bavaria.  The town was transferred to its current district during the Bavarian administrative reforms of 1818.

References

Landshut (district)